Cornelius Buller (22 March 1772 – 11 April 1849) was an English banker who served as Governor of the Bank of England from 1824 to 1826. He had been Deputy Governor from 1822 to 1824. He replaced John Bowden as Governor and was succeeded by John Baker Richards. Buller's tenure as Governor occurred during the Panic of 1825.

Buller was from a prominent Cornish family that included Sir Richard Buller, General Sir George Buller, General Sir Redvers Buller and the Barons Churston. He married Mary Down on 4 May 1801 and had seven sons and three daughters. He died in Kensington in 1849.

See also
 Chief Cashier of the Bank of England

References 

1772 births
1849 deaths
Governors of the Bank of England
British bankers
Deputy Governors of the Bank of England
English people of Cornish descent
Cornelius